Wealhtheow (also rendered Wealhþēow or Wealthow) is a queen of the Danes in the Old English poem, Beowulf, first introduced in line 612.

Character overview
Wealhtheow is of the Wulfing clan, Queen of the Danes. She is married to Hrothgar (Hrōðgār), the Danish king and is the mother of sons, Hreðric and Hroðmund, and a daughter Freawaru. The meaning of her name is disputed. One possible translation is "foreign slave" (Hill, 1990).

In her marriage to Hrothgar she is described as friðusibb folca (l. 2017), 'the kindred pledge of peace between peoples', signifying interdynastic allegiance between Wulfing and Scylding achieved with her marriage to Hrothgar. She is both 'Lady of the Helmings' (l. 620) (by descent, of the Wulfing clan of Helm) and 'Lady of the Scyldings' (l. 1168), by marriage and maternity.

Two northern sources associate the wife of Hrothgar with England. The Skjöldunga saga, in Arngrímur Jónsson's abstract, chapter 3, tells that Hrothgar (Roas) married the daughter of an English king. The Hrolfs saga kraka, chapter 5, tells that Hrothgar (Hróarr) married Ögn who was the daughter of a king of Northumbria (Norðhymbraland) called Norðri.

The argument was advanced in 1897 that the Wulfing name may have been synonymous with the East Anglian Wuffing dynasty, and the family name Helmingas with the place-names 'Helmingham' in Norfolk and Suffolk, both of which lie in areas of 5th–6th century migrant occupation. Although the theory was not favoured by some, it has more recently resurfaced in a discussion of the identity of Hroðmund.

Role in the poem

Wealhtheow (like Hygd) fulfills the important role of hostess in the poem. The importance of this cup carrying practice is emphasized in lines 1161-1231. Here Wealhtheow, anxious that Hrothgar secures the succession for her own offspring, gives a speech and recompenses Beowulf for slaying Grendel with three horses and a necklace.

The necklace is called Brosinga mene, and the name is held to be either a corruption or a misspelling of OE Breosinga mene, ON Brisingamen, Freyja's necklace. Richard North compares the gift of the necklace to Brosing, Freyja's Brisingamen and he comments that,

The wider Old Norse-Icelandic tradition attributes the Brisinga men or giroli Brisings (Brisinger's girdle c.900) to Freya who is at once the sister of Ingvi-freyr of the Vanir, the leading Norse goddess of love, and a witch with the power to revive the dead. Freya's acquisition of this necklace and its theft by Loki are the central incidents in Sorlaþattr.

Wealhtheow has also been examined as a representative of Hrothgar's kingdom and prestige and a fundamental component to the functioning of his court. According to Stacy Klein, Wealhtheow wore “elaborate garb” to demonstrate the “wealth and power” of the kingdom. As queen, Wealhtheow represents the “female's duty to maintain peace between two warring tribes” and to “signify the status of the court.” While her position may appear ritualistic, she also maintains “the cohesiveness of the unity of the warriors.” The role of queens in the early Germania was to foster “social harmony through active diplomacy and conciliation.” Wealhtheow inhabits this role by constantly speaking to each of the men in her hall and reminding them of their obligations – obligations to their country, their family, or their king.

In a grimly ironic passage that would not be lost on the Anglo-Saxon audience of Beowulf Wealhtheow commends her sons to Hroðulf's generosity and protection, not suspecting that he will murder her sons to claim the throne for himself.

All the qualities marking Wealhtheow as an ideal queen place her in contrast to Grendel's mother, who appears for the first time following a lengthy passage concerned with Wealhtheow and her sons. The contrast between Wealhtheow and Grendel's mother echoes the parallels between Beowulf, Hrothgar, and Grendel.

Notes

References
 Boehler, M. (1930). Die altenglischen Frauennamen, Germanische Studien 98. Berlin: Emil Ebering.
 Damico, Helen. Beowulf's Wealhþēow and the Valkyrie Tradition. Madison, Wisconsin: University of Wisconsin Press, 1984.
 Damico, Helen. "The Valkyrie Reflex in Old English Literature." New Readings on Women in Old English Literature. Eds. Helen Damico and Alexandra Hennessey Olsen. Bloomington: Indiana University Press, 1990. 176-89.
 
 Hill, Thomas D. "'Wealhtheow' as a Foreign Slave: Some Continental Analogues." Philological Quarterly 69.1 (Winter 1990): 106-12.
 
 Newton, Sam. The Origins of Beowulf and the pre-Viking Kingdom of East Anglia. D. S. Brewer, Woodbridge 1993.
 North, Richard. Origins of Beowulf: From Vergil to Wiglaf. Oxford: Oxford University Press, 2006.
 {{cite news |first=Marijane |last=Osborn |authorlink=Marijane Osborn |url=http://www.heroicage.org/issues/5/Osborn1.html |title=The Wealth They Left Us:Two Women Author Themselves through Others' Lives in Beowulf |publisher=The Heroic Age: A Journal of Early Medieval Northwestern Europe, heroicage.org, Issue 5 |date=Summer–Autumn 2001}}
 
 Sarrazin, Gregor. "Neue Beowulf-studien," Englische Studien 23, (1897) 221-267.
Trilling, Renée R. (2007). "Beyond Abjection: The Problem with Grendel's Mother Again". Australian and New Zealand Association of Medieval and Early Modern Studies (Inc). Volume 24, Number 1: 1-20 - via Project MUSE. 
 Jurasinski, Stefan. The feminine name Wealhtheow and the problem of Beowulfian anthroponymy'', Neophilologus (2007) .

Characters in Beowulf
English heroic legends
Fictional queens
Geats
People whose existence is disputed